Madeleine Jeanne Louise "Mado" Maurin (24 September 1915 − 8 December 2013) was a French actress, whose career spanned over 55 years.

Life 
Born in Paris, Maurin began her acting career in 1955. Maurin was married twice and was the mother of actors Jean-Pierre Maurin (1941−1996), Yves-Marie Maurin (1944−2009), Patrick Dewaere (1947−1982), Dominique Collignon-Maurin (born 1949), Jean-François Vlérick (born 1957), and Marie-Véronique Maurin (born 1960).

Mado Maurin died of natural causes on 8 December 2013, aged 98, in Paris.

Partial filmography

Le revolver et la rose (1970) - La mère de Catherine
I Don't Know Much, But I'll Say Everything (1973) - La mère à la securité sociale
I Am Pierre Riviere (1976) - La grand-mère
Un si joli village (1979) - Elodie
Le coup de sirocco (1979)
The Woman Cop (1980) - Logeuse
L'amour mensonge (1980) - La mère de Mathieu
A Bad Son (1980) - La femme d'André
Plein Sud (1981) - La concierge
Légitime violence (1982)
Les Misérables (1982) - La bonne de la rue Plumet
Tout le monde peut se tromper (1983) - La première invitée du mariage
Si elle dit oui... je ne dis pas non (1983) - La mamma
Sandy (1983) - Madeleine
Le joli coeur (1984) - Concierge
Rebelote (1984) - Mme No, la nourrice
Viva la vie (1984) - François's Mother
La Garce (1984) - Madame Pasquet
Train d'enfer (1985)
Les mois d'avril sont meurtriers (1987) - La concierge de Clara
Les cigognes n'en font qu'à leur tête (1989) - La surveillante
Le crime d'Antoine (1989) - La voisine
The Favour, the Watch and the Very Big Fish (1991) - Old Lady in Park
Le cahier volé (1992) - La mère supérieure
La poudre aux yeux (1995) - La mère d'Arnold
The Car Keys (1995) - La dame en blanc
Burnt Out (1995) - Patronne de l'hôtel
Sous les toits de Paris (2007) - La mère de Thérèse
R.I.F. (2011) - La mère de Jorelle (final film role)

References

External links

1915 births
2013 deaths
Actresses from Paris
French television actresses
French film actresses
French stage actresses
20th-century French actresses
21st-century French actresses